U.S. Route 97 (US 97) in the U.S. state of Oregon is a major north–south United States highway which runs from the California border, south of Klamath Falls, to the Washington border on the Columbia River, between Biggs Junction, Oregon and Maryhill, Washington.  Other than the northernmost stretch (which is known as the Sherman Highway), US 97 (along with US 197) is known as The Dalles-California Highway. In May 2009, Oregon Senate passed a bill to rename US 97 as "World War II Veterans Historic Highway".

With the exception of Interstate 5 (I-5), US 97 is the most important north–south highway corridor in the state.  It serves two major population centers (Klamath Falls and Bend), and is the main corridor east of the Cascade Mountains.  While much of the highway remains in two-lane undivided configuration, significant sections have been upgraded to expressway or freeway status.

Route description

The run of US 97 in Oregon (running from south to north) starts at the border between Oregon and California, south of the city of Klamath Falls.  The highway starts out as a two-lane road, running through the arid Klamath River basin.  Approaching the city of Klamath Falls, 97 becomes a freeway just south of the junction with OR 140 and OR 66.  The freeway then runs along the western edge of the downtown region, ending at an interchange with Oregon Route 39 near the Oregon Institute of Technology.  Within Klamath Falls is a business route, which runs through downtown via Main Street/Klamath Avenue and Esplanade Avenue, then which turns back to the US 97 mainline via the East Side Bypass (this latter segment co-signed with OR 39).  This section of Highway 97 has been identified as an important alternative to I-5 for traffic in the Medford area in the event of a major earthquake in the region. Various proposals have also identified US 97 as a potential freeway corridor.

Highway 97, once again primarily a two-lane road, continues north along the eastern shore of Upper Klamath Lake.  In the town of Chiloquin is an intersection with Oregon Route 62, which provides access to Crater Lake National Park from the southeast; further north is an interchange with Oregon Route 138 which provides access to the park from the northeast.  Continuing north, near the town of Chemult is an interchange with Oregon Route 58, which heads northwest to Eugene and the Willamette Valley.

In La Pine is a junction with Oregon Route 31; this city marks the start of the Deschutes River recreation area; (Crane Prairie Reservoir, the river's source, is located due west of La Pine).  North of La Pine, the highway becomes an expressway as it passes by the resort community of Sunriver and heads towards the city of Bend. It travels through the city on the Bend Parkway, an expressway with right-in, right-out access and full interchanges. US 97 crosses over US 20 twice in northern Bend and continues northeast from the city.

North of Bend, the highway continues as an expressway until it reaches the city of Redmond. US 97 bypasses the downtown area with a  speed limit on the northern section of this parkway. In Redmond is a short concurrency with Oregon Route 126.  Continuing north out of Redmond, one enters a high desert region marked by numerous deep river gorges, including the Crooked River gorge (which 97 passes over near the Peter Skene Ogden State Scenic Viewpoint and rest area).  Towns along the route include Terrebonne, which provides access to Smith Rock State Park, a climbing mecca, and Culver.  North of Culver, the highway enters the agricultural community of Madras.

South of Madras is an intersection with U.S. Route 26 headed eastbound; the two routes share an alignment through the city.  On the northern edge of town, 97 forks off to the right, heading northeast; and 26 continues northwest towards Portland.  The importance of 97 as a transportation corridor diminishes north of Madras, as most traffic continues to Portland.

South of the community of Shaniko, US 97 forks off its only spur route, U.S. Route 197 which continues heading parallel to the Deschutes River towards Tygh Valley and The Dalles.  Route 97 takes a more easterly course, passing through the high desert region of the Columbia Plateau.  Towns along the route include Grass Valley and Wasco. Just south of Biggs Junction, the highway descends from the plateau into the Columbia River Gorge.  In Biggs is an interchange with Interstate 84 and U.S. Route 30; immediately north of the interchange is the Biggs Rapids-Sam Hill Bridge over the Columbia River.  The river serves as the state line between Oregon and Washington. Work on US 97 near Biggs in 1966 led to the discovery of the Biggs jasper, a sought-after gemstone.

Highways comprised

US 97 comprises the following highways (see Oregon highways and routes), from south to north:

 Part of The Dalles-California Highway No. 4; and
 The Sherman Highway No. 42.

It was also designated as the World War II Veterans Historic Highway in 2009, primarily because it connected several training facilities used by the military during the war.

US 97 Business in Klamath Falls, from south to north, comprises:

 Part of the Klamath Falls-Lakeview Highway No. 20 concurrent with Oregon Route 39;
 The Esplanade Spur, concurrent with Oregon Route 39; and
 Part of the Klamath Falls-Malin Highway No. 50.

US 97 Business in Bend runs from its intersection with the main highway at East 1st Street north of Bend, south on East 1st Street, Deschutes Place, and Wall Street to Newport Avenue, concurrent with U.S. 20 Business, then continues south on a Wall Street-Bond Street couplet and east on Franklin Avenue until it rejoins the main highway at East 3rd Street.

History

US 97 was established in 1926 as part of the initial United States Numbered Highway System approved by the American Association of State Highway Officials (now AASHTO). It gained an auxiliary route, US 197, that was created on October 21, 1951.

The Bend section of US 97 was moved to the Bend Parkway in November 2001, replacing a parallel alignment on 3rd Street that now carries a signed business route. It was one of several options studied to address increased through traffic in Bend, including full bypasses and a one-way couplet on various streets. The AASHTO formally approved the relocation of US 97 onto the Bend Parkway in 2010, along with the creation of US 97 Business.

The expressway was extended towards Sunriver with the construction of additional interchanges and a four-lane highway that opened through the Newberry National Volcanic Monument in 2011. These features are planned to be replaced with full grade separation in response to high collision rates on the Bend Parkway. Similar upgrades are possible at the northern boundary of Bend, dependent upon funding availability and state approval. The busiest part of US 97 is in Bend, with an average of 42,000 cars a day. This is also the busiest section of road in Oregon east of the Cascade Mountains.

A bypass of downtown Redmond was opened in April 2008 at a cost of $90 million, moving US 97 to the east side of downtown Redmond. Plans for other bypasses in La Pine and Madras, as well as four-laning the entire highway in Oregon, have been proposed but not funded by the state government. In 2013, the cost of upgrading all of US 97 to a four-lane highway with limited access was estimated to be $10 billion.

A planned realignment of US 97 near La Pine was scrapped during construction in the late 2010s due to unstable soil conditions. A four-lane overpass at Wickiup Junction would replace the last remaining at-grade railroad crossing on US 97 and was approved by ODOT in 2014 with $17 million in funding. Construction began in March 2016 and was delayed for several months during the installation of steel beams for the overpass in August, which fell while being lifted into place. A geotechnical survey found that the overpass site was over a layer of unstable soil created by a lake formed 10,000 years before present by a volcanic eruption that dammed the Deschutes River. The layer also had the uncompressed remains of diatoms, which would prevent a reliable estimation of how the soils would settle. The Oregon Transportation Commission shut down the project in October 2017 and redirected $3 million of the unspent funds to other safety improvements for US 97 in La Pine. ODOT contractors removed the overpass's steel girders in late 2018, leaving the embankments and retaining walls in place.

Major intersections
Mileposts are measured from north to south. They do not reflect actual mileage due to realignments.

Related routes

Klamath Falls business route

Bend business route

US 97 Business in Bend follows the former alignment of US 97 on 3rd Street, which was replaced by the opening of the Bend Parkway in 2001. It is partially concurrent with US 20.

Redmond business route

US 97 Business in Redmond follows the former alignment on US 97 on a pair of one-way streets in downtown Redmond. It was replaced by the opening of an eastern bypass in 2008.

References

External links

 Oregon
97
Transportation in Deschutes County, Oregon
Transportation in Klamath County, Oregon
Transportation in Wasco County, Oregon
Transportation in Jefferson County, Oregon
Transportation in Sherman County, Oregon